Ezaa (Ezza, Eza) is an Igboid language spoken in Ebonyi state in Nigeria. It forms a dialect cluster with closely related Izii, Ikwo, and Mgbo, though they are only marginally mutually intelligible.

References

Igbo language